Kim Hye-lim (born 6 December 1985) is a South Korean sabre fencer.

Kim won the bronze medal at the sabre 2006 World Fencing Championships after she lost 15-14 to Rebecca Ward in the semi final.

Achievements
 2006 World Fencing Championships, sabre

References

1985 births
Living people
South Korean female fencers
Place of birth missing (living people)
Asian Games medalists in fencing
Fencers at the 2006 Asian Games
Fencers at the 2010 Asian Games
South Korean sabre fencers
Asian Games gold medalists for South Korea
Asian Games silver medalists for South Korea
Medalists at the 2006 Asian Games
Medalists at the 2010 Asian Games
Universiade medalists in fencing
Universiade gold medalists for South Korea
Universiade bronze medalists for South Korea
Medalists at the 2009 Summer Universiade
21st-century South Korean women